Mount Alston is a mountain on Vancouver Island, British Columbia, Canada,  east of Gold River and  south of Sutton Peak. The source of the Nimpkish River is on the west slope of Mount Alston, 700 metres from its summit.

See also
List of mountains in Canada

References

Alston, Mount
One-thousanders of British Columbia
Rupert Land District